Dwijendralal College, (Bengali: দ্বিজেন্দ্রলাল কলেজ) established in 1968, is the general degree college in Nadia district.

It was established as Krishnanagar College of Commerce, which was renamed later as Dwijendralal College.

Departments

Arts and Commerce

Bengali
English
Sanskrit
History
Geography
Political Science
Education
Philosophy
Commerce

Accreditation
The college is recognized by the University Grants Commission (UGC). In 2003 it was accredited by the National Assessment and Accreditation Council (NAAC), and awarded C grade, an accreditation that has since then expired.

See also

References

External links
Dwijendralal College
University of Kalyani
University Grants Commission
National Assessment and Accreditation Council

Commerce colleges in India
Universities and colleges in Nadia district
Colleges affiliated to University of Kalyani
Educational institutions established in 1968
1968 establishments in West Bengal